The 2017–18 EuroCup Women is the sixteenth edition of FIBA Europe's second-tier international competition for women's basketball clubs under such name.

Teams
Teams were confirmed by FIBA Europe on 27 June 2017.

Qualification round

Conference 1

|}

Conference 2

|}

Group stage
Draw for the group stage was made on 4 July 2017 in Munich, Germany.

Conference 1

Group A

Group B

Group C

Group D

Group E

Conference 2

Group F

Group G

Group H

Group I

Group J

Ranking of third-placed teams

Conference 1

Conference 2

Seeding

Play-off Round 1

|}

Round of 16

|}

Round of 8

|}

Quarterfinals

|}

Semifinals

|}

Final

|}

See also
 2017–18 EuroLeague Women

References

External links
 EuroCup Women website

EuroCup Women seasons
2017–18 in European women's basketball leagues